Ahmady is a surname of Arabic origins, meaning "descended from or associated with Ạhmad". People with this surname include:

 Ahmad Jan Ahmady (born 1974), director of the Administrative Office of the President of the Islamic Emirate of Afghanistan
 Ajmal Ahmady (born 1978), Afghan-American economist and politician
 Kameel Ahmady, Iranian-born British scholar working in the field of social anthropology, of Kurdish descent
 Leeza Ahmady (born 1972), Afghan-born American independent curator, author, arts administrator, dance instructor, and educator.
 Waleed El Ahmady, Egyptian bridge player

See also 

 Ahmad (disambiguation)

Surnames of Arabic origin